Yoshiki is a masculine Japanese given name.

Possible writings
Yoshiki can be written using many different combinations of kanji characters. Here are some examples:

義樹, "justice, tree"
義基, "justice, foundation"
義機, "justice, opportunity"
義起, "justice, to rise"
義希, "justice, hope"
吉樹, "good luck, tree"
吉基, "good luck, foundation"
吉機, "good luck, opportunity"
吉起, "good luck, to rise"
吉希, "good luck, hope"
善樹, "virtuous, tree"
善基, "virtuous, foundation"
善機, "virtuous, opportunity"
善起, "virtuous, to rise"
善希, "virtuous, hope"
芳樹, "virtuous/fragrant, tree"
芳基, "virtuous/fragrant, foundation"
芳機, "virtuous/fragrant, opportunity"
芳起, "virtuous/fragrant, to rise"
芳希, "virtuous/fragrant, hope"
良樹, "good, tree"
良基, "good, foundation"
良機, "good, opportunity"
慶起, "congratulate, to rise"

The name can also be written in hiragana よしき or katakana ヨシキ.

Notable people with the name
, Japanese novelist
, better known as Yoshiki, Japanese musician and record producer
, Japanese footballer
, Japanese footballer
, Japanese singer-songwriter and guitarist
, Japanese physicist
, Japanese footballer
, Japanese footballer
, Japanese footballer
, Japanese manga artist
, Japanese footballer
, Japanese video game designer
, Japanese footballer
, Japanese film director and screenwriter
, Japanese screenwriter
, Japanese biologist
, Japanese baseball player
, Japanese footballer
, ring name of Kazuo Takahashi (born 1969), Japanese mixed martial artist
, Japanese manga artist
, Japanese novelist
, Japanese manga artist
, Japanese badminton player
, Japanese footballer
, Japanese politician

Fictional characters
Yoshiki Kishinuma (岸沼 良樹), a character in video game Corpse Party

See also 
 Yoshiki District (disambiguation)
 Japanese name

Japanese masculine given names